Där jag är e’re alltid bäst (English: Where I Am It Is Always Best) is the twelfth studio album by Swedish pop and rock artist Magnus Uggla. It was released in 2000. Musically, the album was a return to Uggla's early punk and hard rock roots. The album cover art is a spoof on the cover of the classic album Slayed? by Slade. The album became successful in Sweden, charting on the Swedish Albums Chart for 23 weeks, peaking at number one. It was subsequently certified 2 x platinum in the country.

Track listing
All songs written by Magnus Uggla and Anders Henriksson, except for "Kan det vara kärlek", which is written entirely by Uggla.
"Stockholms heta nätter" - 3:35
"Nitar och läder" - 4:03
"Dumma flickor" - 3:40
"Morsan e’ okej" - 3:23
"Stockholms största teaser" - 3:44
"Hotta brudar" - 3:08
"I hela världen" - 4:34
"Testosteron" - 3:53
"Inte alls förbannad" - 2:38
"Kan det vara kärlek" - 3:01 (Magnus Uggla)
"Klättermusen" - 4:11
"I himmelen" - 3:46

Singles
The songs, "Nitar & läder", "Hotta brudar", "Morsan é okej" and "Stockholms heta nätter", were released as singles.

Charts

References 

2000 albums
Magnus Uggla albums
Swedish-language albums